Below are the squads for the 1930 FIFA World Cup tournament in Uruguay.

Yugoslavia (3 players from French clubs) and Peru (1 player from a Mexican club) were the only teams to have players from foreign clubs.

Group 1

Argentina
Head coach: Francisco Olazar and Juan José Tramutola

Chile
Head coach:  György Orth

France
Head coach: Raoul Caudron

Mexico
Head coach: Juan Luque de Serrallonga

Group 2

Yugoslavia
Head coach: Boško Simonović

Brazil
Head coach: Píndaro de Carvalho Rodrigues

Notes
Players Doca (São Cristóvão) and Benevenuto (Flamengo) traveled with the team but were not registered because the competition rules in article 5 only allowed 22 players for squad.
Araken never played for Flamengo. He was registered as a club athlete just as a matter of formality, since APEA (São Paulo) was in a power struggle over command of Brazilian football with the CBD, situated in Rio de Janeiro.

Bolivia
Head coach: Ulises Saucedo

Group 3

Uruguay
Head coach: Alberto Suppici

Romania
Head coach: Costel Rădulescu

Peru
Head coach:  Francisco Bru

Group 4

United States
Head coach:  Robert Millar

Paraguay
Head coach:  José Durand Laguna

Belgium
Head coach: Hector Goetinck

NB*: Rosters include reserves, alternates, and preselected players that may have participated or pre-tournament friendlies but not in the finals themselves.

References

 weltfussball.de 

 Политика (2006–)

Squads
FIFA World Cup squads